Judith Bingham  (born 21 June 1952) is an English composer and mezzo-soprano singer.

Life 
Bingham was born on 21 June 1952, in Nottingham. Her parents are Jack Bingham and Peggy Bingham (née McGowan). She was educated at High Storrs Grammar School for Girls in Sheffield, and attended the Royal Academy of Music from 1970 to 1973, where she received the Principal’s Prize for Music in 1972 and was elected as an associate in 1997. Her teachers included Malcolm MacDonald, Eric Fenby, Alan Bush and John Hall (composition) and Jean Austin-Dobson (singing).

After graduation, she continued her composition studies privately with Hans Keller (1974–80). She is a Fellow of the Royal Northern College of Music. She was a member of the BBC Singers from 1983 to 1995.

Bingham was appointed Officer of the Order of the British Empire (OBE) in the 2020 New Year Honours for services to music.

In 1985, she married Andrew Petrow but the marriage dissolved in 2011.

List of works
 Flynn, opera, subtitled Music-theatre on the life and times of Errol Flynn, in three scenes, three solos, four duets, a mad song and an interlude, 1977–78.
Chartres (orchestral), 1988
Beyond Redemption (orchestral), 1994–5
The Temple at Karnak (orchestral), 1996
Passaggio (concerto for bassoon and orchestra), 1998
The Shooting Star (concerto for trumpet and orchestra), 1999
Salt in the Blood (for choir and brass orchestra), 1995
The Darkness Is No Darkness (for choir and organ), 1993
The Snows Descend (for brass orchestra), 1997
First Light (for choir and brass orchestra), 2001
Bright Spirit (for wind ensemble), 2001
Mass (2003)
The Secret Garden (Botanical fantasy for SATB and organ), 2004
Leonardo (concerto for bassoon and thirteen Strings), (2012)
Ghostly Grace (for choir and organ), 2015
Watch With Me (Anthem for Somme 100 Vigil), 2016

References
S. Fuller and N. LeFanu, eds.: 'Reclaiming the Muse', Contemporary Music Review, xi (1994), 37
'Composer in interview: Judith Bingham': Mark Doran in conversation with Judith Bingham, Tempo, Vol 58, No.230 (2004)

Notes

External links
 MusicWeb page about Bingham

1952 births
Living people
20th-century British composers
21st-century British composers
Brass band composers
British women classical composers
English composers
Officers of the Order of the British Empire
Alumni of the Royal Academy of Music
People educated at High Storrs Grammar School for Girls
People from Nottingham